Jack Murdock may refer to:
Jack Murdock (basketball) (born 1934), head basketball coach at Wake Forest
Jack Murdock (actor) (1922–2001), American actor
Jack Murdock (American football), American football coach
Jack Murdock (comics), the father of Marvel Comics' character Daredevil

See also
John Murdock (disambiguation)